Paul Braendli (fl. 1980s-1990s) is a Swiss intellectual property administrator. He was the second president of the European Patent Office (EPO), serving from 1 May 1985 to 31 December 1995.

References 

Living people
20th-century Swiss lawyers
Year of birth missing (living people)
European Patent Organisation people